Guwahati Municipal Corporation (GMC) is the local government in Guwahati, Assam, India. GMC was formed in the year 1971 by the Guwahati Municipal Corporation Act, 1969. The Corporation was duly constituted in 1974 in the first meeting of the elected councillors as per provision of Sec.45 of this Act.

Municipal Corporation mechanism in India was introduced during British Rule with formation of municipal corporation in Madras (Chennai) in 1688, later followed by municipal corporations in Bombay (Mumbai) and Calcutta (Kolkata) by 1762. Guwahati Municipal Corporation Municipal Corporation is headed by Mayor of city and governed by Commissioner.

A municipal corporation is the highest form of urban local body (ULB) in India. Presently, GMC is divided into 60 municipal wards.

Organisational setup
The Mayor and the Deputy Mayor are responsible for the 60 Municipal wards of Guwahati Municipality Corporation, who is the head of a council consisting of 60 elected ward commissioners.

The Commissioner is responsible for the proper functioning of the corporation. He is assisted by Additional Commissioner and Joint Commissioner. A Chief Engineer for The Water Works Department and the Public Works Department division is responsible. A Superintendent Engineer is responsible for the Garage branch.

The accounts branch is the responsibility of a Financial Advisor, a Chief Accounts, and an Audit Officer. Each revenue zone is headed by a Deputy Commissioner.

Functions 
Guwahati Municipal Corporation is created for the following functions:

 Planning for the town including its surroundings which are covered under its Department's Urban Planning Authority .
 Approving construction of new buildings and authorising use of land for various purposes.
 Improvement of the town's economic and Social status.
 Arrangements of water supply towards commercial,residential and industrial purposes.
 Planning for fire contingencies through Fire Service Departments.
 Creation of solid waste management,public health system and sanitary services.
 Working for the development of ecological aspect like development of Urban Forestry and making guidelines for environmental protection.
 Working for the development of weaker sections of the society like mentally and physically handicapped,old age and gender biased people.
 Making efforts for improvement of slums and poverty removal in the town.

Elections

Branches
 Conservancy
 Water Works Tax Division
 Public Works
 Building Permission
 Street light and Electrical Section
 Municipal Markets
 Sanitation & Health
 Veterinary
 Enforcement
 Property Tax
 Mutation Branch
 Trade Licence
 Advertisement
 Slow Moving Vehicle Branch
 Dead body and night soil removal Branch
 Poverty alleviation
 Birth and death registration
 Garage Branch
 Accounts Branch

Sources of revenue
 Property Tax comprising a general tax, water tax, scavenging tax, light tax, and urban tax.
 Trade Licence Fee
 Entry Toll
 Parking Fees
 Toll and rent from Municipal markets
 Tax on Advertisements
 Tax on Slow Moving Vehicles
 Animal Tax
 Building permission Fees and Penalties
 Water Connection Charge
 Fines
 Share of Motor Vehicle Tax
 Share of Entertainment Tax
 Share of Land Revenue and Surcharge on Stamp Duty

See also
 Guwahati Metropolitan Development Authority

References

External links
 

Municipal corporations in Assam
1974 establishments in Assam
Guwahati